Michael Millett (22 September 1977 – 21 September 1995) was an English footballer who played for Wigan Athletic. Millett was regarded as a talented youngster who could play in defence or midfield. He had represented England at U16 and U18 level, and made his first-team debut for Wigan towards the end of the 1994-95 season. He played three league games and one League Cup match for the Latics, before being killed in a car crash on 21 September 1995, one day before his 18th birthday. The crash happened near Garswood, Merseyside.

References

1977 births
1995 deaths
English footballers
Wigan Athletic F.C. players
Road incident deaths in England
Footballers from Wigan
Association football defenders
Association football midfielders
English children